Rhythm and Weep is a 1946 short subject directed by Jules White starring American slapstick comedy team The Three Stooges (Moe Howard, Larry Fine and Curly Howard). It is the 95th entry in the series released by Columbia Pictures starring the comedians, who released 190 shorts for the studio between 1934 and 1959.

Plot
The Stooges play the roles of unsuccessful actors who have decided to end it all by jumping off a skyscraper. On top of the building, they discover three girls with an unsuccessful dancing act who have also decided to jump. The Stooges immediately fall in love with the girls. The six distraught lovers are still planning to jump when they suddenly hear piano music playing. They leave the ledge to go find the source of the music. On a lower floor they discover a piano-playing millionaire who is looking for a talented act. He promises them a significant amount of money if they are good. Their act is a success with the millionaire, who doubles their salaries and says, "The way I throw my money around, I bet you think I'm crazy!" As if on cue, two men in white coats come to take him back to an asylum.

Production notes
The title parodies the card-game expression "Read 'Em and Weep." Ruth Godfrey was director Jules White's daughter-in-law (she was the wife of his son).

This short contained one of the few instances that the Stooges broke the "fourth wall". During his time on the ledge, Larry hugs his girl, looks into the camera, and says to the audience: "This I like! And I get paid for it, too!"

Curly's illness
Rhythm and Weep was filmed on April 23–26, 1946, the penultimate entry produced featuring Curly Howard as a member of the Stooges.

The 42-year-old comedian had suffered a series of minor strokes over the previous 16 months prior to filming, and his performances had been unpredictable. By the time of Rhythm and Weep, he had lost a considerable amount of weight, and lines had creased his face.

While director Edward Bernds devised ways to cover his illness, Jules White simply gave most of Curly's lines to Larry. In fact, Curly was so ill during production that he could no longer remember what few lines he had. Moe's son-in-law Norman Maurer was present during filming, and recalled Curly was hurting. "He was having trouble with his coordination," recalled Maurer. "He was supposed to pop pills in his mouth during the (doctor's office) scene, but the scene was switched to Moe putting the pills into Curly's mouth because of Curly's physical problems."

References

External links 
 
 
Rhythm and Weep at threestooges.net

1946 films
1946 comedy films
The Three Stooges films
American black-and-white films
Films directed by Jules White
Columbia Pictures short films
American comedy short films
1940s English-language films
1940s American films